Lumplee Football Club (Thai องค์การบริหารส่วนตำบลลุมพลี), is a Thai football club based in Ayutthaya province, Thailand. The club is currently playing in the Thai Football Division 3.

Record

References
 104 ทีมร่วมชิงชัย! แบโผผลจับสลาก ดิวิชั่น 3 ฤดูกาล 2016

External links
 Facebookpage

Association football clubs established in 2016
Football clubs in Thailand
Phra Nakhon Si Ayutthaya province
2016 establishments in Thailand